Organisation for National Development is a political party in Antigua and Barbuda. The party was formed in January 2003, by a group that left the United Progressive Party. Founders included Glentis Goodwin (chairman of the new party), Melford Nicholas and Valerie Samuel.

Following its formation, OND denounced the UPP leadership as 'corrupt and dictatorial'.

Political parties in Antigua and Barbuda
Political parties established in 2003
2003 establishments in Antigua and Barbuda